Xico  is a city located in the central part of the state of Veracruz. It produces coffee, tropical fruit, wine, handicrafts, and other products. It is 25 km from state capital Xalapa.
Every year in July, Xico has a very large Bullfighting event. In 2006, Veracruz Governor Fidel Herrera attended the event. 

Three kilometres outside the town is Cascada de Texolo.

External links 
  Municipal Official Site

Populated places in Veracruz
Pueblos Mágicos